The 2021 Rugby Football League Championship is a rugby league football competition played in England, and France. It is the second tier of the three tiers of professional rugby league in England, below Super League, and above League 1. The sponsors for the league are the bookmakers, Betfred and the league will continue to be known as the Betfred Championship.

Teams
The league comprises 14 teams playing 22 matches each in the regular season. Each teams will play nine others twice (home and away) and play the other four teams just one (home or away).

Fixtures and results

The governing body, the Rugby Football League (RFL) decided that the Summer Bash will not be played due to restrictions imposed due to the COVID-19 pandemic in the United Kingdom which will limit or prohibit the attendance of spectators.

Following an RFL meeting with both the Championship and League 1 clubs, it was agreed that golden point extra time would be suspended for this season, following concerns over the welfare of players and staff.

The RFL also issued guidance on clubs travelling to France to play Toulouse. While UK COVID-19 quarantine rules require travellers to isolate for five days on return from France, the RFL stated that it was permissible for the part-time clubs in the Championship to postpone fixtures against Toulouse. The postponement did not apply to London Broncos as the club's players are full-time.

Cancelled and forfeited matches
In March 2021 the RFL announced that the part-time clubs in the Championship would not have to travel to France to play Toulouse while the quarantine rules requiring  travellers to isolate for five days were in force. This ruling did not apply to the full-time club, London Broncos. London were due to travel to Toulouse for a match on 17 April but declined to do so. The RFL therefore awarded the two competition points to Toulouse with the score recorded as 24–0. The match does not count towards the number of games played by London towards qualification for the play-offs.  The RFL also referred London to the off-field compliance board for failing to fulfil a fixture.  At a subsequent meeting the compliance board deducted 2 points from London for beaching the operational rules by failing to fulfil the match.

Toulouse's game against Bradford, scheduled for 19 June 2021 was cancelled on 4 June due to the quarantine rules. There were no free dates in the calendar to accommodate re-scheduling so the game was not played.

London's game against Widnes scheduled for 25 July was  cancelled on 20 July, after London Broncos reported more than seven players requiring to isolate, the match was postponed then cancelled as the clubs agreed there was no possible date available for re-arranging the fixture.

Other points deductions
In August, Featherstone were deducted two competition points (the equivalent of a win) for breaching RFL Operational Rules. In breach of UK government restrictions during the COVID-19 pandemic the club hosted an indoor gathering on 27 March at which 12 members of the first team were present. Under RFL COVID-19 protocols all the players involved should have been stood-down and ordered to self-isolate. The club did not comply with the protocols and also failed to assist with the RFL investigation into the incident.

Regular season table
As a precaution against disruption to fixtures due to COVID-19, league placings will be decided by points percentage, rather than points. After the regular season of 22 rounds, the top six teams will go forward to the play-offs, with the winners being promoted to Super League for 2022. The two teams finishing bottom of the Championship after the regular season will be relegated to League 1.

Play-offs

The play-off structure and dates were confirmed on 20 August and will take place over three weekends commencing 25 September. The first weekend will see 3rd play 6th and 4th play 5th in a double header. The following weekend will be another double header with 1st playing the lowest ranked play-off winning team and 2nd playing the highest ranked play-off winner.  The winners of these two matches will meet in the Million Pound Game on Sunday 10 October.

Team bracket

Summary

Awards
The end of year awards for the 2021 Championship season were announced on 29 September 2021.

References

Rugby Football League Championship
2021 in English rugby league
2021 in French rugby league